Scuffletown, Kentucky may refer to:

Scuffletown, Bullitt County, Kentucky
Scuffletown, Henderson County, Kentucky